Wieltje Farm Cemetery is a Commonwealth War Graves Commission burial ground for the dead of the First World War located near Ypres (Ieper) in Belgium on the Western Front.

The cemetery grounds were assigned to the United Kingdom in perpetuity by King Albert I of Belgium in recognition of the sacrifices made by the British Empire in the defence and liberation of Belgium during the war.

Foundation
The cemetery, named after a nearby farm, was begun by the 2nd and 4th Gloucesters amongst others in July 1917. It was closed in October 1917.

The cemetery was designed by A J S Hutton.

References

External links
 
 Wieltje Farm Cemetery at Find a Grave

Commonwealth War Graves Commission cemeteries in Belgium
Cemeteries and memorials in West Flanders